Möödakarvapai (A Smoothing Caress) is the fifth Dagö album, released in 2008.

Track listing
 Möödakarvapai (A Smoothing Caress)
 Tartu (feat. J. Karjalainen)
 Veider (Peculiar)
 Vao (Nursing Home)
 Välismaal (Abroad)
 Ääremail (Borderlands)
 Hr Ahven (Mister Ahven)
 Anu maal ja (Anu in the Country and)
 Imal toomingas ja üllas kuu (Cloying Hagberry and Noble Moon)
 Järgmisel hommikul (The Morning After)
 Eraelu (Private Life)

References
Dagö's Official Website

2008 albums
Dagö albums
Estonian-language albums